Gurak-e Sadat (also Romanized as Gūrak-e Sādāt and Gūrak Sādāt; also known as Goorak, Gūrak, Kūrak, Mahāni, and Ma‘nā’ī) is a village in Delvar Rural District, Delvar District, Tangestan County, Bushehr Province, Iran. At the 2006 census, its population was 669, in 151 families.

References 

Populated places in Tangestan County